The Boss of the Blues is a 1956 album by the American singer Big Joe Turner. Originally released on the Atlantic label, the album has been reissued many times on cassette and CD by Atlantic, Rhino and Collectables.

History
From the 1920s through the 1930s, Turner and boogie-woogie pianist Pete Johnson enjoyed a successful and highly influential collaboration that, following their appearance together at Carnegie Hall on December 23, 1938, helped launch a craze for boogie-woogie in the United States. After the pair separated, Turner continued to experience cross-genre musical success, establishing himself as one of the founders of rock and roll with such smash hits as "Shake, Rattle and Roll", but he did not turn his back on his roots. The Boss of the Blues marks one of the last reunions Turner would have with Johnson, when, supported by a number of swing's best performers, he re-created a number of the classic tracks that had helped lay the groundwork for rhythm and blues.

The bold, vigorous arrangements by the veteran Ernie Wilkins fully represent the traditions of Kansas City music, while also giving a 'mainstream' platform to the musicians, not all of whom, including both Pete Brown and Lawrence Brown, had Kansas City backgrounds.

Track listing
Except where otherwise indicated, all tracks composed by Pete Johnson and Big Joe Turner.
 "Cherry Red" – 3:21
 "Roll 'Em Pete" – 3:41
 "I Want a Little Girl" (Murray Mencher, Billy Moll) – 4:16
 "Low Down Dog" (Turner) – 3:38
 "Wee Baby Blues" – 7:15
 "You're Driving Me Crazy (What Did I Do?)" (Walter Donaldson) – 4:10
 "How Long Blues" (traditional) – 5:43
 "Morning Glories" (traditional) – 3:39
 "St. Louis Blues" (W. C. Handy) – 4:17
 "Piney Brown Blues" – 4:49

Personnel

Performance
 Lawrence Brown – trombone
 Pete Brown – alto saxophone
 Freddie Green – guitar
 Pete Johnson – piano
 Cliff Leeman – drums
 Joe Newman – trumpet, except tracks 3, 5, 6, 8 and 9
 Jimmy Nottingham – trumpet on tracks 3, 5, 6 and 9
 Walter Page – double bass
 Seldon Powell – tenor saxophone on tracks 3, 5, 6 and 9
 Big Joe Turner – vocals
 Frank Wess – tenor saxophone, except tracks 3, 5, 6, 8 and 9

Production
 Whitney Balliett – liner notes
 Bob Defrin – art direction, design
 Nesuhi Ertegun – production, supervision
 Len Frank – engineering
 Marvin Israel – artwork
 Curtice Taylor – hand coloring
 Jerry Wexler – production, supervision
 Ernie Wilkins – arrangements

References

Big Joe Turner albums
Albums produced by Jerry Wexler
Albums produced by Nesuhi Ertegun
1956 live albums
Atlantic Records live albums
Albums arranged by Ernie Wilkins